The Mongolian redfin (Chanodichthys mongolicus) is a species of ray-finned fish in the genus Chanodichthys. This East Asian freshwater cyprinid is found in China, Russia and Mongolia where it ranges from the Amur River south to the Yangtze and inland to Lake Buir and Kherlen River. There are also records from the Red River in Vietnam that probably are this species.

References 

Chanodichthys
Fish described in 1855
Taxa named by Stepan Ivanovich Basilewsky